The Polish 100 Złotych note is a denomination of Polish currency.

History 
The note was issued in 19 denominations, by the Narodowy Bank Polski and date its origins to 1528 as the "ducat," although there is debate about which polish coins was the first zloty. The 20th-century zloty dates back to 1924.  The Zlotych notes were withdrawn from circulation in 1995.  The currency was devalued and worth very little after many years of high inflation in Poland during the communist period; when the new zloty currency was introduced in 1995, four zeros were dropped from the currency.

References

External links

NBP

Currencies introduced in 1995
Banknotes of Poland
One-hundred-base-unit banknotes